Thomaston, Maine is a town on the coast of Maine the United States.  The name may also refer to:

Thomaston (CDP), Maine, a census-designated place comprising the center of the town
South Thomaston, Maine, an adjacent town